Len Earl Ackland (born 1944) is a journalist and retired journalism professor from the University of Colorado Boulder. He was founding director of the Center for Environmental Journalism in 1992.

He graduated from the University of Colorado Boulder with a bachelor's degree in history, and from the Johns Hopkins University School of Advanced International Studies with a Master's degree. 
He was a humanitarian worker, RAND researcher and freelance writer during the Vietnam War in 1967-68.
He was a reporter for the Chicago Tribune and the Des Moines Register, where he won The George Polk Award in 1978 for a series on discriminatory mortgage lending, or "redlining."   
He was editor of the Bulletin of the Atomic Scientists when it won the 1987 National Magazine Award for a special issue on the Chernobyl nuclear accident. In 1991 he joined the faculty of the University of Colorado Boulder.  Heath is a member of the Unitarian Universalist Church of Boulder.

Awards
2008 Guggenheim Fellowship
1990 John D. and Catherine T. MacArthur Foundation research and writing grant
1987 National Magazine Award, as editor
1987 George Polk Award
1988 honorary Doctor of Humane Letters from the Meadville Lombard Theological School in Chicago.

Works
Making a Real Killing: Rocky Flats and the Nuclear West University of New Mexico Press, 1999, ; 2002, 
Credibility gap: a digest of the Pentagon papers, National Peace Literature Service, 1972
"Assessing the Nuclear Age", co-editor, Educational Foundation for Nuclear Science, 1986
"Why Are We Still in Vietnam", co-editor, Random House, 1970

References

1944 births
Living people
University of Colorado faculty
University of Colorado Boulder alumni
Johns Hopkins University alumni
American war correspondents
Chicago Tribune people
MacArthur Fellows
University of Colorado Boulder faculty